Claude France (March 9, 1893 – January 3, 1928) born in Emden, Germany; was a German-born French actress. She was born Jane Joséphine Anna Françoise Wittig. She was discovered by Leon Gaumont who was impressed with her beauty. She had worked as a French spy, and was connected with the denunciation of Mati Hari, with whom she had a friendly relationship.  For reasons not clear she committed suicide by gas poisoning at her home in Paris.

Selected filmography
 Le Carnaval des vérités (1920)
 L'autre aile (1924)
 Modern Marriages (1924)
 Imperial Violets (1924)
  (1925)
 Boarding House Groonen (1925)
 Le bossu (1925)
 The Abbot Constantine (1925)
 Fan Fan the Tulip (1925)
 Le berceau de dieu (1926)
 Simone (1926)
 Lady Harrington (1927)
 André Cornélis (1927)
 Madonna of the Sleeping Cars (1928)
 Island of Love (1929)

Bibliography
 Jung, Uli & Schatzberg, Walter. Beyond Caligari: The Films of Robert Wiene. Berghahn Books, 1999.

External links

1893 births
1928 deaths
People from Emden
People from the Province of Hanover
French film actresses
French silent film actresses
20th-century French actresses
1928 suicides
Suicides by gas
Suicides in France
German emigrants to France